Trouble Every Day is the name of Tindersticks' soundtrack to French director Claire Denis's 2001 film Trouble Every Day.

The album charted in SNEP, French official albums chart, entering the chart at number 133 and staying for one week.

Track listing
"Opening Titles"
"Dream"
"Houses"
"Maid Theme 1"
"Room 321"
"Computer"
"Notre Dame"
"Killing Theme"
"Taxi to Coré"
"Coré on Stairs/Love Theme"
"Maid Theme (End)"
"Closing Titles"
"Killing Theme (Alternative version)"
"Trouble Every Day"

References

Tindersticks albums
2001 soundtrack albums
Beggars Banquet Records soundtracks
Horror film soundtracks